Patania batrachina is a moth in the family Crambidae. It was described by Edward Meyrick in 1936. It is found in the Democratic Republic of the Congo (Equateur).

The larvae feed on Fleurya aestuans and Boehmeria nivea.

References

Moths described in 1936
Spilomelinae
Moths of Africa